Cuddle time may refer to:

Cuddle time (attachment therapy)
Cuddle party, non-sexual group physical intimacy
Cuddle Time, a programming segment on Tiny Pop